Athanasius Schneider, ORC (born Anton Schneider on 7 April 1961) is a Catholic prelate, serving as the Auxiliary Bishop of Astana in Kazakhstan. He is a member of the Canons Regular of the Holy Cross of Coimbra. He is known for championing the pre-Vatican II liturgical traditions and practices of the Church and for protesting certain current policies, including some associated with Pope Francis.

Family and early life
Anton Schneider was born in Tokmok, Kirghiz SSR, in the Soviet Union. According to Athanasius Schneider′s account, his parents were Black Sea Germans (ethnic German settlers who lived along the northern coast of the Black Sea in the Russian Empire), who at the end of World War II were evacuated to Berlin whence they were deported and exiled by the USSR regime to a labor camp in Krasnokamsk in the Ural Mountains. His family was closely involved with the underground church. Schneider's mother Maria was one of several women to shelter the Blessed Oleksa Zaryckyj, a Ukrainian priest later imprisoned at the infamous Karlag and in 1963 martyred by the Soviet regime for his ministry. The family relocated to the Kirghiz SSR after being released from the camps, then left Central Asia for Estonia. As a boy, Schneider and his three siblings would attend clandestine Masses with their parents, often traveling sixty miles from the family's home in Valga to Tartu, taking the first train in the morning under the cover of darkness and returning with the last train at night. Due to the great distance, infrequent visits by the clergy, and crackdowns by the Soviet authorities, they were able to make the trip only once a month. In 1973, shortly after making his first Holy Communion in secret, Schneider emigrated with his family to Rottweil in West Germany.

Training and priesthood
In 1982 in Austria, Schneider joined the Canons Regular of the Holy Cross of Coimbra, a Roman Catholic religious order within the Opus Sanctorum Angelorum, and took the religious name Athanasius. He was ordained a priest by Bishop Manuel Pestana Filho of Anápolis on 25 March 1990, and spent several years as a priest in Brazil before returning to Central Asia. Starting in 1999, he taught Patristics at Mary, Mother of the Church Seminary in Karaganda. On 2 June 2006 he was consecrated a bishop at the Altar of the Chair of Saint Peter in the Vatican by Cardinal Angelo Sodano. In 2011 he was transferred to the position of auxiliary bishop in the Archdiocese of Astana. He is the General Secretary of the Bishops' Conference of Kazakhstan.

Schneider speaks German, Russian, Portuguese, Spanish, English, French and Italian, and he reads Latin and Ancient Greek.

Views
Schneider is known for his traditionalism. He has criticized clergy members who he believes do not fully adhere to the faith and instead surrender to what he calls a "cruel pagan world." In 2014, he compared them to "members of the clergy and even bishops who put grains of incense in front of the statue of the emperor or of a pagan idol or who delivered the books of the Holy Scripture to be burned." He alleged that the present Catholic Church is beset by "traitors of the Faith."

Schneider has frequently travelled to conferences hosted by conservative and traditional Catholics. In 2018, he was warned by the Holy See to limit his travel outside his diocese, as canon law only allows a bishop to be absent for no more than a month unless on official duty. This led to him increasingly appearing at conferences via video.

Holy Communion
Schneider passionately supports the liturgical tradition of receiving Holy Communion on the tongue while kneeling, as a sign of love for the body and blood of Jesus. This is the theme of his 2008 book Dominus Est, published in Italian, and since translated into English, German, Estonian, Lithuanian, Polish, Hungarian and Chinese. The book contains a foreword written by Malcolm Ranjith, then the Secretary of the Congregation for Divine Worship, currently Archbishop of Colombo and Metropolitan head of the church in Sri Lanka. In the book, Schneider writes that receiving Holy Communion in this way had become standard practice in the church by the 5th century, and that Pope Gregory I strongly chastised priests who refused to follow this tradition. He wrote in 2009: "The awareness of the greatness of the eucharistic mystery is demonstrated in a special way by the manner in which the body of the Lord is distributed and received."

Schneider has vigorously upheld the traditional teaching of the Catholic Church that divorce and remarriage outside of it constitutes the mortal sin of adultery, and thus makes one ineligible to receive Holy Communion. In a 2014 interview, Schneider said that calls to change this practice came from "anti-Christian media." He suggested this was "a false concept of mercy," saying: "It is comparable to a doctor who gives a [diabetic] patient sugar, although he knows it will kill him." In 2016, Pope Francis released the apostolic exhortation Amoris laetitia which seemed to allow divorced and civilly remarried persons to take the Eucharist under some circumstances, and this was put into practice by some bishops, arousing intense controversy. Schneider strongly criticized this, asserting that the perennial teaching is "more powerful and surer than the discordant voice and practice of admitting unrepentant adulterers to Holy Communion, even if this practice is promoted by a single Pope or the diocesan bishops." On April 7, 2018, Schneider, along with conservative cardinals Raymond Leo Burke and Walter Brandmüller, participated in a conference rejecting the outline proposed by German bishops to allow divorced and civilly remarried Catholics to receive the Eucharist. Schneider spoke of the duty of popes to be "custodians" of authority.

Clergy sex abuse
On August 25, 2018, Archbishop Carlo Maria Viganò, former apostolic nuncio to the United States, released an 11-page letter describing a series of warnings to the Vatican regarding sexual misconduct by Theodore McCarrick, accusing Francis of failing to act on these reports and calling on him to resign. Schneider said that there was "no reasonable and plausible cause to doubt the truth content of the document." He demanded "ruthlessness and transparency" in cleansing the church of evils, particularly "homosexual cliques and networks" in the curia that he and some others have blamed for helping to cause the abuse epidemic. Schneider called on all "cardinals, bishops and priests to renounce any compromise and any flirtation with the world."

Interreligious relations
Schneider stated in a January 2013 interview that proselytizing by "false religions and sects" should be restricted in majority-Catholic counties. "When there is (a Catholic majority) then false religions and sects have not the right to make propaganda there," he said. Schneider added that this does not mean that governments can "suppress them, they can live, but (governments) cannot give them the same right to make propaganda to the detriment of Catholics."

Schneider has spoken out against Muslim immigration into Europe. He stated in a 2018 interview that heavy Muslim immigration during the 2010s was orchestrated by "international powerful political organizations...to take away from Europe its Christian and its national identity. It is meant to dilute the Christian and the national character of Europe." Schneider alleged that the Syrian Civil War was orchestrated by international powers with a view to stirring up a migrant crisis to de-Christianize Europe, and that mass immigration into Europe from Northern Africa was likewise "artificially created."

During Pope Francis' visit to Kazakhstan in September 2022, Schneider criticized him for promoting a "supermarket of religions" from which people could freely choose. "This is not correct because there is only one true religion, which is the Catholic Church, founded by God himself, but commanded to all men, to all religions, to believe and accept his son Jesus Christ, the only savior," Schneider said.

Liturgy
Schneider is a strong promoter of the Tridentine Mass. He has rebuked priests for using "a careless and superficial–almost an entertainment style" of liturgy, adding that liturgy must be conducted with "beauty and reverence." According to Schneider, "You cannot change the liturgy by the tastes of the time. The liturgy is timeless." Schneider has offered Divine Liturgy in the Byzantine Rite numerous times, praising it as "permeated with respect, with reverence, with a supernatural spirit and adoration."

Declaration of Truths
At a theological conference in Rome in December 2010, Schneider proposed the need for "a new Syllabus" (recalling the Syllabus of Errors of 1864), in which papal teaching authority would correct erroneous interpretations of the documents of the Second Vatican Council.

On June 10, 2019, Schneider, along with cardinals Burke and Jānis Pujats, as well as Kazakh archbishops Tomasz Peta of Astana and Jan Paul Lenga, published a 40-point "Declaration of Truths" claiming to reaffirm traditional church teaching. The bishops wrote that such a declaration was necessary in a time of "almost universal doctrinal confusion and disorientation." Specific passages in the declaration implicitly reply to writings of Pope Francis. The declaration states that "the religion born of faith in Jesus Christ" is the "only religion positively willed by God," seemingly alluding to the Document on Human Fraternity signed by Pope Francis, which stated that the "diversity of religions" is "willed by God." Following recent changes to the Catechism of the Catholic Church to oppose capital punishment, the declaration states that the church "did not err" in teaching that civil authorities may "lawfully exercise capital punishment" when it is "truly necessary" and to preserve the "just order of societies."

Amazon Synod
In September 2019, Schneider and Burke published an 8-page letter denouncing six alleged theological errors in the working document for the Synod of Bishops for the Pan-Amazon region, and asking that Pope Francis "confirm his brethren in the faith by an unambiguous rejection of the errors." Burke and Schneider criticized the Synod document for its "implicit pantheism," support for married clergy, a greater role for women in the liturgy, and excessive openness to Amazonian pagan rituals and practices. They asked the laity and clergy to pray at least one decade of the Rosary and to fast weekly for the rejection of such ideas over a 40-day period from September 17 to October 26.

Second Vatican Council
In an article dated May 31, 2020, Schneider argued that the Second Vatican Council introduced erroneous statements never before taught by the magisterium of the church. He also states the novelties of the Council are directly responsible for the crisis of faith experienced in the Catholic Church in the second half of the 20th century and in the 21st century.

Society of Saint Pius X
Schneider considers that Catholic faithful can licitly go to Masses and participate in the Churches of the traditional Society of Saint Pius X.

References

Bibliography
 
 
Schneider, Athanasius (2019). Christus Vincit: Christ's Triumph Over the Darkness of the Age: In conversation with Diane Montagna, Angelico Press, ISBN 978-1-62138-490-8 
Schneider, Athanasius (2021). The Springtime That Never Came: Bishop Athanasius Schneider in conversation with Pawel Lisicki, Sophia Institute Press, ISBN 978-1-64413-513-6
Schneider, Athanasius (2021). The Catholic Mass: Steps to Restore the Centrality of God in the Liturgy by Athanasius Schneider with Aurelio Porfiri Translated by Diane Montagna, Sophia Institute Press, ISBN 978-1-64413-540-2

Interviews 
 
 Schneider, Athanasius; Fülep Dániel (6 March 2016). Exclusive interview with His Excellence DR. ATHANASIUS SCHNEIDER O.R.C. by Dániel Fülep director (Newman Center of Hungary) https://rorate-caeli.blogspot.com/2016/04/exclusive-interview-with-bishop.html or here: http://newman.hu/index.php/interview-with-schneider/  or here at Gloria.tv https://gloria.tv/text/2wFmpf23UdG1CQZeWn1fWiNGE
 Schneider, Athanasius; Fülep Dániel (6 March 2016). REGNUM EUCHARISTICUM. The first visit of Bishop Athanasius Schneider to Hungary.
Three lectures, a sermon and an exclusive interview. Hungarian and English language e-book version: http://mek.oszk.hu/15500/15547/15547.pdf (For the English version, see page 77)
 Schneider, Athanasius; Fülep Dániel (July 2018). CATHOLIC CHURCH: WHERE ARE YOU HEADING?, Interview book, Theologian Dániel Fülep's interview with Bishop Athanasius Schneider, Auxiliary Bishop of the Archdiocese of Saint Mary in Astana. The e-book is free download. Hungarian Electronic Library 
http://mek.oszk.hu/18600/18638/18638.pdf

External links 

 

21st-century Roman Catholic titular bishops
Kazakhstani people of German descent
Kazakhstani Roman Catholic bishops
Kazakhstani traditionalist Catholics
People from Chüy Region
Living people
1961 births